A largeworker was a form of silversmith in England from the 17th to the early 20th centuries who made items of a larger size such as dishes or candlesticks. When craftsmen registered their mark they would classify themselves as "goldworker", "smallworker", or "largeworker" according to their skill and specialism.

References

External links 

Metalworking terminology
Silversmithing